Fakahina Airfied is a public operational airport located at in Fakahina atoll in French Polynesia.

Specifications 
The Fakahina Airfield has one runway with a direction 10/28 and a length of 900m. The runway has a concrete surface.

The airport is located at an elevation of 10 ft (3 m) from mean sea level and it is open to public.

References 

Airports in French Polynesia